Xuri may refer to these places in China:

Xuri Subdistrict, a subdistrict of Shangrao County, Jiangxi
Xuri Township, a township in Sêrtar County, Sichuan